Forch is a railway station in the Swiss canton of Zürich and the municipality of Küsnacht. It is the principal intermediate station and headquarters of the Forchbahn (FB), which is operated as Zürich S-Bahn service S18 and provides links to the city of Zürich and the nearby village of Esslingen. The station is operated by the Forchbahn, and serves the village of Forch.

The Forchbahn's depot and workshop is adjacent and to the north of the station, and are sheltered by a landscaped roof that blends with the natural contours of the land. The line was relocated to its current alignment in 1970, including the provision of a new tunnel under the A52 motorway.

References

External links 
 

Railway stations in the canton of Zürich